The Mara is a left tributary of the river Iza in Romania. It discharges into the Iza in Vadu Izei. Its main tributary is the Cosău.

Tributaries
The following rivers are tributaries to the river Mara:

Left: Valea Seacă, Poiana, Lazu
Right: Runc, Râuşor, Valea Mare, Breboaia, Cosău

References

Rivers of Romania
Rivers of Maramureș County